Bernhard Scheid (born 1960) is an Austrian historian, academic, and Japanologist, affiliated to the Austrian Academy of Sciences and the Institute of East Asian Studies at the University of Vienna (Institut für Ostasienkunde der Universität Wien). In addition, Scheid counts among the Austrian top players of the game of Go.

Early life
Scheid matriculated at the University of Vienna in 1980.  His early interest in cultural anthropology led to a specialization in Japanese studies.  He earned a master's degree in 1993.  From 1994 to 1996, he studied at Waseda University in Tokyo. His Ph.D. was awarded by the University of Vienna in 1999.

Career 
Scheid started working as a research fellow at the Austrian Academy of Sciences, Institute for the Cultural and Intellectual History of Asia (Institut für Kultur- und Geistesgeschichte Asiens) in 1990. In 2002, he became a permanent research fellow in the field of Japanese Studies at this institution.  He also joined the faculty of the Department of East Asian Studies at Vienna University in 2001 as a lecturer on Japanese religion. In 2012, he served as a visiting professor at the University of Göttingen, faculty of religious studies.

His early research and writing investigated aspects of aging and becoming old in the Japanese Middle Ages (12th–16th centuries), from the late-Heian period through the Sengoku period. According to Scheid's first published work, Im Innersten meines Herzens empfinde ich tiefe Scham: das Alter im Schrifttum das japanischen Mittelalters (In my Heart of Hearts I Feel Deep Shame: Aging in the Japanese Medieval Literature), the perceived norm of old age primarily as a time of suffering and isolation changed in a context of the newly emerging feudal structures.

In 2001, Scheid produced the first monograph on Yoshida Shintō in a Western language, including translations of three important Yoshida texts.  The comprehensive religious system which became known as Yoshida Shinto was founded by Yoshida Kanetomo (1435–1511).  Scheid's work investigated  this seminal figure's influence on the evolution of Shinto ritual and theology in the Muromachi period through the Azuchi-Momoyama period. Since then, Scheid produced a number of academic articles and edited volumes on various aspects of Shinto and Japanese religious history in general. In 2017 and 2020, he received grants from the Austrian Science Fund (FWF) to lead two consecutive research projects on the history of Shinto in Early Modern (Edo-period) Japan.

In the course of his research activities, Scheid has also developed and maintained academic websites with the objective of advancing teaching and research in Japanese studies.

Go 
Scheid began playing Go in the early 1980s and quickly advanced to one of the top Go players of that country, winning the Austrian National Go Championship six times in 1990, 1992, 1998, 1999, 2003, and 2004. From 1991, he qualified as Austrian representative in various international Amateur Go Championships in Japan, China, and Korea. 
In 2010, he tied for 16th place in the  31st World Amateur Go Championship (WAGC) in Hangzhou, China.

Selected works

Monographs and edited volumes

Digital projects

External Sources 

 academia.edu
 ORCID
 WorldCat

Notes

Historians of Japan
Living people
1960 births
Austrian Academy of Sciences
Academic staff of the University of Vienna
University of Vienna alumni
Waseda University alumni